Ismail Hussain (1 April 1950 – 24 April 2015) was an Indian politician who was a member of the Indian Parliament representing the Barpeta for the Indian National Congress party.

References

1950 births
2015 deaths
India MPs 2009–2014
Lok Sabha members from Assam
Indian National Congress politicians from Assam
People from Barpeta